The Gusinaya (Xaastaax) is a river in the Sakha Republic (Yakutia), Russia.

The river flows north of the Arctic Circle, across territories of the Allaikhovsky District marked by permafrost. There are no settlements along its course, only some hunting huts.

Course
The Gusinaya has its sources in the southeastern shore of Empe-Talalakh (Эмпе-Талалах) lake of the northern end of the Yana-Indigirka Lowland, East Siberian Lowland. Its channel meanders strongly all along among numerous lakes, some of them quite large. In the lower course the river divides into channels and turns southeast and then northeast, before emptying into the Gusinaya Bay of the East Siberian Sea to the south of the mouth of the Volchya.

Tributaries  
The river is frozen between the beginning of October and mid June.

See also
List of rivers of Russia

References

External links 
Fishing & Tourism in Yakutia

Drainage basins of the East Siberian Sea
Rivers of the Sakha Republic
East Siberian Lowland